Jordan Steeven Sierra Flores (born 23 April 1997) is an Ecuadorian footballer who plays as a midfielder for Liga MX club Juárez. He made his debut for Ecuador on 22 February 2017 in a match against the Honduras.

Honours

UANL
 CONCACAF Champions League: 2020

References

1997 births
Living people
Ecuadorian footballers
Ecuador under-20 international footballers
Ecuador international footballers
Ecuadorian expatriate footballers
Ecuadorian Serie A players
Manta F.C. footballers
Delfín S.C. footballers
Lobos BUAP footballers
Expatriate footballers in Mexico
Association football midfielders
Association football defenders
People from Manta, Ecuador